Black 13 is a 1953 British crime drama film directed by Ken Hughes and starring Peter Reynolds, Rona Anderson, Patrick Barr and John Le Mesurier. The film is a remake of the 1948 Italian film Gioventù perduta (also known as Lost Youth) by Pietro Germi. It was made by Vandyke Productions.

Premise
The son of a university professor goes on a crime spree, which turns deadly serious when he kills a nightwatchman. The title refers to a roulette wheel.

Cast
 Peter Reynolds as Stephen 
 Rona Anderson as Claire 
 Patrick Barr as Robert 
 Lana Morris as Marion 
 Genine Graham as Stella 
 Michael Balfour as Joe 
 John Forrest as Wally 
 Viola Lyel as Mrs. Barclay 
 Martin Walker as Professor Barclay 
 John Le Mesurier as Inspector 
 Martin Benson as Bruno

References

External links

 
Review of film at Variety

1953 films
Films directed by Ken Hughes
Remakes of Italian films
1953 crime drama films
British crime drama films
20th Century Fox films
British black-and-white films
1950s English-language films
1950s British films